The 2006 Men's Intercontinental Cup was a qualifier for the 2006 Men's Hockey World Cup. It was held between 12 and 23 April 2006 in Changzhou, China. New Zealand won the tournament after defeating Korea 4–1 in the final. Alongside England, Pakistan and Japan, these five teams qualified for the World Cup.

Qualification
All five confederations received quotas for teams to participate allocated by the International Hockey Federation based upon the FIH World Rankings. Those teams participated at their respective continental championships but could not qualify through it, and they received the chance to qualify through this tournament based on the final ranking at each competition.

Umpires
Below are the 14 umpires appointed by the International Hockey Federation:

Christian Blasch (GER)
Chen Dekang (CHN)
Henrik Ehlers (DEN)
Faiz Muhammad Faizi (PAK)
Murray Grime (AUS)
Nigel Iggo (NZL)
Kim Hong-lae (KOR)
Andy Mair (SCO)
Raghu Prasad (IND)
Sumesh Putra (CAN)
Amarjit Singh (MAS)
Pedro Teixeira da Silva (POR)
Rob ten Cate (NED)
John Wright (RSA)

Results
All times are China Standard Time (UTC+08:00)

Pool A

Pool B

Ninth to twelfth place classification

Crossover

Eleventh and twelfth place

Ninth and tenth place

Fifth to eighth place classification

Crossover

Seventh and eighth place

Fifth and sixth place

First to fourth place classification

Semi-finals

Third and fourth place

Final

Final standings

See also
2006 Women's Intercontinental Cup

References

External links
Official website

Men's Intercontinental Cup (field hockey)
Intercontinental Cup
Intercontinental Cup
International field hockey competitions hosted by China
Sport in Jiangsu
Changzhou
Intercontinental Cup